This is a list of re-established companies. This list comprises companies that became defunct, but were later re-established, with the same name, under a new incorporation or management.

Re-established companies

  20th Century Fox Records 
  4th & B'way Records 
  Abercrombie & Fitch
  Acorn Computers (2006) 
  Agitprop! Records 
  Albert Productions 
  American Record Company 
  Apex Records (Canada) 
  Ardent Records 
  Arena Football League
  Argus (camera company) 
  Asylum Records 
  Atlus 
  Attack Records
  Avalanche Software
  Azuli Records 
  BankUnited 
  Bennigan's 
  Best & Co. 
  Biograph Company 
  Black Swan Records 
  Blue Thumb Records 
  Bromley Originate Change 
  Brunswick Records 
  Builders Square 
  Cameo-Parkway Records 
  Canaan Records 
  CanJet 
  Carolco Pictures 
  Casablanca Records 
  CBS Productions 
  Charisma Records 
  Claridge Records 
  CNR Music 
  Coleco 
  Commodore International 
  Crazy Eddie – Went defunct in 1989, was revived in 2005, went defunct again, was revived again in 2012
  Creation Records 
  Cryo Interactive 
  Cryptovision Records 
  Dark Horse Records 
  Deram Records 
  Diamond Records 
  Disturbing tha Peace 
  Dunwich Records 
  Duquesne Brewing Company 
  Edison Records 
  Embassy Records 
  Epic/Sony Records 
  Epitaph Records 
  F-Beat Records 
  Factory Records 
  Fontana Records 
  Format Films 
  Galaxy Records 
  Gennett Records 
  Go! Discs 
  Goody's (store)
  Grand Prix Drivers' Association 
  Grateful Dead Records
  Gulf Oil 
  Hallmark Records 
  Harmony Records 
  Harvest Records 
  Heartbeat Productions 
  Hechinger 
  Herwin Records 
  Hickory Records 
  His Master's Voice 
  Hostess (snack cakes) 
  IBM India 
  ImageMovers 
  Imperial Records 
  Impulse! Records 
  Industrial Records 
  I.R.S. Records 
  Italy Records 
  Jacobson's 
  Kama Sutra Records 
  Latent Recordings 
  Lava Records 
  Liberty Records 
  Lincoln Records 
  Linens 'n Things 
  Loud Records 
  Marvel Music 
  Mokum Records 
  Montgomery Ward 
  Morgan-McClure Motorsports 
  Namco 
  Northern League (baseball, 1993–2010) 
  NorthWestern Corporation 
  Okeh Records 
  Old HB 
  Oriole Records (UK) 
  Orion Pictures 
  Packard Bell 
  Pan American Airways (1996–1998) 
  Pan American Airways (1998–2004) 
  Paramount Records 
  Paramount Television 
  Peacock Records 
  Perfect Records 
  Playboy Records – relaunched as a jazz label distributed by Concord Records
  The Pop Shoppe 
  Priority Records 
  Lilly Pulitzer 
  Quality Records 
  Radar Records 
  Radiex Records 
  Rankin/Bass Productions 
  RCA
  RCA Music Group 
  Red Letter Days 
  Regal Recordings 
  Regal Zonophone Records 
  Reprise Records 
  RKO/Unique Records 
  RockResorts 
  Rough Trade Records 
  Salsoul Records 
  Seeland Records 
  Service Merchandise 
  Sierra Entertainment 
  Silvertone Records (1916) 
  Slash Records 
  Smash Records 
  Sonar Entertainment 
  Soul City Records (American label) 
  Stateside Records 
  Stiff Records 
  StreetSounds (record label) 
  Sun Country Airlines 
  Sunshine Records (United States)
  T-Neck Records 
  Toys "R" Us
  TriStar Pictures 
  Turner Pictures 
  Uni Records 
  Vee-Jay Records 
  Verve Forecast Records 
  Verve Records 
  Vocalion Records 
  Walter Lantz Productions 
  Warner Bros. Cartoons 
  White Noise Records 
  Wing Records 
  The Wiz (store) 
  WRocK Online 
  WXB 102 
  Zantigo
  Zonophone

See also

 Lists of companies

References

 
Re-established